4D (4th Dimension, or Silver Surfer, as it was known during early development) is a relational database management system and IDE developed by Laurent Ribardière. 4D was created in 1984 and had a slightly delayed public release for Macintosh in 1987 with its own programming language.

The 4D product line has since expanded to an SQL back-end, integrated compiler, integration of PHP, and several productivity plug-ins and interfaces. Some of the plug-ins created by 4D include 4D Write (a word processor), 4D View (somewhat like a spreadsheet, but with extra functionality) and 4D Internet Commands (which allowed for the addition of Internet-related functionality to a database). There are also over 100 third-party plugins, free and commercial.

4D can also be used as a web server, to run compiled database applications.

Today, 4D is published by the French company 4D SAS and has a sales, distribution and support presence in most major markets, with the United States, the United Kingdom, and France being the primary markets. The product is localized in more than a dozen languages.

History 
Silver Surfer, as it was known during early development, was developed by Laurent Ribardière in 1984.  Following negotiations with Ribardiere it was planned that Apple Inc. (formerly Apple Computer Inc) would publish the software but Apple canceled the plan, reportedly due to pressure from other potential database publishers who claimed that if Apple had their own "brand" database, third party products would be disadvantaged in the marketplace. Apple tried at the time to ensure well-known software publishers supported the Macintosh platform, and as a result the project reverted to Laurent Ribardière, who with the French businesswoman Marylene Delbourg-Delphis published 4th Dimension. Although independently published, Apple supported the new venture and used 4D extensively throughout the organization for projects including fitness center management and CIM (Computer Integrated Manufacturing). A number of Apple personnel became 4D experts, including Lance McAndrew in Apple's Cupertino headquarters and Andrew O'Donoghue in Apple's Ireland-based European manufacturing headquarters, where a 4th Dimension application managed the European Service Center administration.

Over the next few years 4th Dimension's installed base grew, and the publisher ACI established a US-based subsidiary called ACIUS, initially led by Guy Kawasaki. After 16 years of operating as ACIUS up to 2000, the name was officially changed to 4D Inc.

In 1993, 4D Server v1.1, the client/server version of 4th Dimension was introduced along with the release of 4th Dimension v3.1.

In 1995, 4D v3.5 went cross-platform and has since then supported both the Microsoft Windows and Apple Macintosh operating systems.

In 1997, 4D v6 was the first version of 4D to contain a fully integrated web server, allowing developers to translate 4D forms into HTML on the fly using only the 4D language.

In 2004, 4D 2004 was the first version of 4D to allow developers to create standalone, client/server, web and Service Oriented Applications (SOA) without changing any code.

In 2008, 4D v11 added a SQL layer to the 4D database engine and extending native SQL in to the 4D programming language which allowed 4D developers to write native SQL code to connect to either local or remote servers.

In 2010, 4D v12 integrated the ability to execute PHP functions/scripts from within the 4D programming language. This version also supported new replication and synchronization commands and included a 64 bit version of 4D Server.

Version history

Architecture
A 4D application can run in either Standalone mode or Client-Server mode.

Single-User 
In Standalone mode, the 4D application (4D.exe on Windows or 4D.app on Mac) is used to open the structure file (4DB/4DC) file directly along with the associated data file (4DD).

Client-Server 
In the Client-Server paradigm the 4D Server application (4DServer.exe on Windows or 4DServer.app on Mac) is used to open the structure file (4DB/4DC) file directly along with the associated data file (4DD). 4D may then be used in remote mode to connect to the 4D Server.

Application Editions 
4D has two applications; 4D and 4D Server. 4D Server runs only as a server but 4D can be run in either standalone or remote mode.

4D 
4D can be run in two modes. 4D in single-user mode allows for 1 person to run the application. 4D in remote mode is used for connecting to a 4D Server.

4D Server 
4D Server is used for Client-Server connectivity to the application. In this mode, 4D Server loads the structure file (4DB or 4DC) and also the datafile (4DD) and provides network access to 4D (in remote). Each workstation has a dynamically updated cache of the resources they are working with, while the 4D Server maintains the data and code.

Syntax 
This section will include syntax examples demonstrating different programming constructs used in 4D, such as for loops and variable usage.

Data Types 
4D fields, variables, and expressions can be of the following data types:

More info on 4D data type can be found on the [ 4D Data Types] documentation page

Variable Scope 
Local variables are prefixed with a $ like $myLocalVariable and only live for the duration of the method.

Process variables have no prefix like myProcessVariable and live throughout the duration of the process.

Inter-process (or Global) variables are prefixed with a <> like <>myGlobalVariable and live throughout the duration of the application.

Comparison of looping

For 
For(vCounter;1;100)
  // Do something
End for

While 
 $i :=1 // Initialize the counter
 While($i<=100) // Loop 100 times
  // Do something
    $i :=$i +1 // Need to increment the counter
 End while

Repeat 
 $i :=1 // Initialize the counter
 Repeat
  // Do something
    $i :=$i +1 // Need to increment the counter
 Until($i=100) // Loop 100 times

Nested Loops 
The following example goes through all the elements of a two-dimensional array:
 For($vlElem;1;Size of array(anArray))
  // ...
  // Do something with the row
  // ...
    For($vlSubElem;1;Size of array(anArray{$vlElem}))
       // Do something with the element
       anArray{$vlElem}{$vlSubElem}:=...
    End for
 End for

The following example builds an array of pointers to all the date fields present in the database:
 ARRAY POINTER($apDateFields;0)
 $vlElem:=0
 For($vlTable;1;Get last table number)
   // loop over each table number with $vTable as the number
    If(Is table number valid($vlTable)) 
      // check if table number $vTable is valid
      // only loop on the valid table 
       For($vlField;1;Get last field number($vlTable)) 
         // loop over each field number within current table 
         // with $vlField as the current field number
          If(Is field number valid($vlTable;$vlField))
            // check if field number is valid
             $vpField:=Field($vlTable;$vlField) // get pointer to field
             If(Type($vpField->)=Is date) 
               // check if current field is a date
               // only performs these actions if field is a date
                $vlElem:=$vlElem+1
                INSERT IN ARRAY($apDateFields;$vlElem)
                $apDateFields{$vlElem}:=$vpField
             End if
          End If
       End for
    End If
 End for

References

External links 

 
 4D Documentation (new & legacy)
 New 4D Forum (http://discuss.4d.com/)
 4D Knowledge Base
 
 

Proprietary database management systems
Desktop database application development tools
Procedural programming languages
Cross-platform software
Programming languages created in 1984
High-level programming languages
Relational database management systems